Elephant Boy may refer to:

Elephant Boy (film), a 1937 film based on Rudyard Kipling's "Toomai of the Elephants"
Elephant Boy (TV series), a 1973 TV series based on "Toomai of the Elephants"
 "Elephant Boy", the nickname of Fred Schreiber, of The Howard Stern Show's The Wack Pack

See also
 Mahout